Nguyễn Trần Anh Tuấn is a Vietnamese weightlifter. He represented Vietnam at the 2019 World Weightlifting Championships, as well as the 2015 and 2016 Asian Championships.

He won the silver medal in the men's 61kg event at the 2022 Asian Weightlifting Championships held in Manama, Bahrain.

References

External links

Living people
1998 births
Vietnamese male weightlifters
Weightlifters at the 2014 Summer Youth Olympics
21st-century Vietnamese people